The Kragujevac Wild Boars are an American football team from Kragujevac, Serbia. 

As a team, Wild Boars arose from friendly tossing on the field. Organized play began in the winter of 2002–03 and culminated with first ever game in Serbia in spring 2003, in which they beat SBB Vukovi Beograd.

Since then, Wild Boars have won seven national championships - 2004, 2006, 2008, 2009, 2010, 2016 and 2017, and participated in the final of the Serbian Cup in 2005. In 2011, they played the EFAF Cup finals in London against the London Blitz.

External links

Official website

American football teams in Serbia
American football teams established in 2003
Sport in Kragujevac
2003 establishments in Serbia